"Mistletoe"  is an original Christmas song written and performed by Colbie Caillat. It was co-written by Caillat's friend and former manager, Stacy Blue, and producer Mikal Blue. "Mistletoe" was released as a standalone single on November 20, 2007. A re-recorded version of the song was included on Caillat's 2012 holiday album, Christmas in the Sand.

Composition
"Mistletoe" was composed in the key of C Major and set to a "moderately slow" tempo of 60 BPM. Caillat's vocals range from G through C. The song discusses the experience of spending Christmas time without family or loved ones and represents a "slower paced romantic song" in contrast to the other, generally uptempo, original tracks on Christmas in the Sand.

Release
The original 2007 version of the song was produced by Mikal Blue and released as a digital download single on November 20, 2007. This recording was also included on the 2008 compilation album, The Essential Now That's What I Call Christmas. In 2012, Caillat recorded a new version produced by her father, Ken Caillat, for her holiday album, Christmas in the Sand.

In popular culture
The song was featured in the 2008 films Baby Mama, and Will You Merry Me?.

Reception
"Mistletoe" debuted at number 86 on the Billboard Hot 100 chart dated December 8, 2007. The song reached a peak position of 75 the following week. "Mistletoe" also peaked at number 7 on the Adult Contemporary chart, marking Caillat's second straight top-10 single on that survey.

In Canada, "Mistletoe" performed slightly better with a debut of 74 on the Canadian Hot 100 chart dated December 8, 2007 and an eventual peak of 56 in January 2008. The song also reached the top 3 of the Canadian Adult Contemporary chart.

USA Today cited "Mistletoe" as the most-downloaded new holiday song of 2007.

Charts

References

2007 singles
Colbie Caillat songs
American Christmas songs
Songs written by Colbie Caillat
2007 songs
Universal Republic Records singles
Songs written by Mikal Blue